Reproductive Toxicology is a peer-reviewed journal published bimonthly by Elsevier which focuses on the effects of toxic substances on the reproductive system. The journal was established in 1987 and is affiliated with the European Teratology Society. According to the Journal Citation Reports, the journal has a 2013 impact factor of 2.771.

References

Toxicology journals
Elsevier academic journals
Publications established in 1987
Bimonthly journals
English-language journals